The 2014 FIFA World Cup was the 20th FIFA World Cup, the quadrennial world championship for men's national football teams organised by FIFA. It took place in Brazil from 12 June to 13 July 2014, after the country was awarded the hosting rights in 2007. It was the second time that Brazil staged the competition, the first being in 1950, and the fifth time that it was held in South America.

31 national teams advanced through qualification competitions to join the host nation in the final tournament (with Bosnia and Herzegovina as the only debutant). A total of 64 matches were played in 12 venues located in as many host cities across Brazil. For the first time at a World Cup finals, match officials used goal-line technology, as well as vanishing spray for free kicks. FIFA Fan Fests in each host city gathered a total of 5 million people, and the country received 1 million visitors from 202 countries. Every World Cup-winning team since the first tournament in 1930 – Argentina, Brazil, England, France, Germany, Italy, Spain and Uruguay – qualified for this tournament, for the last time to date. Spain, the defending champions, were eliminated at the group stage, along with England and Italy. Uruguay were eliminated in the round of 16, and France exited in the quarter-finals. Host nation Brazil, who had won the 2013 FIFA Confederations Cup, lost to Germany 7–1 in the semi-finals and eventually finished in fourth place.

In the final, Germany defeated Argentina 1–0 after extra time thanks to a Mario Götze half-volley in the 113th minute of the final to win the tournament and secure the country's fourth world title, the first after German reunification in 1990, when as West Germany they also beat Argentina by the same score in 90 minutes in the World Cup final. Germany became the first European team to win a World Cup staged in the Americas, and this result marked the third consecutive title won by a European team, after Italy in 2006 and Spain in 2010.

Host selection

In March 2003, FIFA announced that the tournament would be held in South America for the first time since 1978, in line with its policy at the time of rotating the right to host the World Cup among different confederations. With the 2010 FIFA World Cup hosted in South Africa, it would be the second consecutive World Cup outside Europe, which was a first for the tournament. It was also second in the Southern Hemisphere. Only Brazil and Colombia formally declared their candidacy but, after the withdrawal of the latter from the process, Brazil was officially elected as host nation unopposed on 30 October 2007.

Participating teams and officials

Qualification

Following qualification matches played between June 2011 and November 2013, the following 32 teams – shown with their last pre-tournament FIFA world ranking – qualified for the final tournament. Twenty-four of these teams were returning participants from the 2010 World Cup. Bosnia and Herzegovina were the only team with no previous appearance at the World Cup finals. Colombia qualified for the World Cup after 16 years of absence, while Belgium and Russia both returned after 12 years. Paraguay failed to qualify for the first time since 1994. This was also the first World Cup for 32 years that did not feature a representative from the Nordic countries. The highest ranked team not to qualify was Ukraine (ranked 16th), while the lowest ranked team that did qualify was Australia (ranked 62nd).

AFC (4)
  (62)
  (43)
  (46)
  (57)

CAF (5)
  (22)
  (56)
  (37)
  (23)
  (44)

OFC (0)
 None qualified

CONCACAF (4)
  (28)
  (33)
  (20)
  (13)

CONMEBOL (6)
  (5)
  (3) (hosts)
  (14)
  (8)
  (26)
  (7)

UEFA (13)
  (11)
  (21)
  (18)
  (10)
  (17)
  (2)
  (12)
  (9)
  (15)
  (4)
  (19)
  (1)
  (6)

As of 2022, this was the last time Chile, Ivory Coast, Greece, Italy, Honduras, and Algeria qualified for the World Cup finals, and the only time Bosnia and Herzegovina have qualified, and the last time Saudi Arabia, Morocco, Tunisia, Senegal, Denmark, Poland, and Serbia failed to qualify. This was also the most recent World Cup finals to feature every prior winning team.

Final draw

The 32 participating teams were drawn into eight groups. In preparation for this, the teams were organised into four pots with the seven highest-ranked teams joining host nation Brazil in the seeded pot. As with the previous tournaments, FIFA aimed to create groups which maximised geographic separation and therefore the unseeded teams were arranged into pots based on geographic considerations. The draw took place on 6 December 2013 at the Costa do Sauípe resort in Bahia, during which the teams were drawn by various past World Cup-winning players. Under the draw procedure, one randomly drawn team – Italy – was firstly relocated from Pot 4 to Pot 2 to create four equal pots of eight teams.

Officials

In March 2013, FIFA published a list of 52 prospective referees, each paired, on the basis of nationality, with two assistant referees, from all six football confederations for the tournament. On 14 January 2014, the FIFA Referees Committee appointed 25 referee trios and eight support duos representing 43 countries for the tournament.
Yuichi Nishimura from Japan acted as referee in the opening match whereas Nicola Rizzoli from Italy acted as referee in the final.

Squads

As with the 2010 tournament, each team's squad consisted of 23 players (three of whom must be goalkeepers). Each participating national association had to confirm their final 23-player squad no later than 10 days before the start of the tournament. Teams were permitted to make late replacements in the event of serious injury, at any time up to 24 hours before their first game. During a match, all remaining squad members not named in the starting team were available to be one of the three permitted substitutions (provided the player was not serving a suspension).

Venues

12 venues (seven new and five renovated) in twelve cities were selected for the tournament. The venues covered all the main regions of Brazil and created more evenly distributed hosting than the 1950 finals in Brazil. Consequently, the tournament required long-distance travel for teams. During the World Cup, Brazilian cities were also home to the participating teams at 32 separate base camps, as well as staging official fan fests where supporters could view the games.

The most used stadiums were the Maracanã and Brasilia, which hosted seven matches each. The least-used venues were in Cuiabá, Manaus, Natal, and Curitiba, which hosted four matches each; as the four smallest stadiums in use at the tournament, they did not host any knockout round matches.

Team base camps
Base camps were used by the 32 national squads to stay and train before and during the World Cup tournament. On 31 January 2014, FIFA announced the base camps for each participating team, having earlier circulated a brochure of 84 prospective locations. Most teams opted to stay in the Southeast Region of Brazil, with only eight teams choosing other regions; five teams (Croatia, Germany, Ghana, Greece and Switzerland) opted to stay in the Northeast Region and three teams (Ecuador, South Korea and Spain) opted to stay in the South Region. None opted to stay in the North Region or the Central-West Region. Campo Bahia, the base camp of the eventual champion Germany, attracted much interest.

{| class="wikitable collapsible collapsed"
|-
!colspan="2"| National squads' base camps
|-

|}

FIFA Fan Fests

For a third consecutive World Cup tournament, FIFA staged FIFA Fan Fests in each of the 12 host cities throughout the competition. Prominent examples were the Copacabana Beach in Rio de Janeiro, which already held a Fan Fest in 2010, and São Paulo's Vale do Anhangabaú. The first official event took place on Iracema Beach, in Fortaleza, on 8 June 2014.

Innovations

Technologies

In order to avoid ghost goals, the 2014 World Cup introduced goal-line technology following successful trials at among others 2013 Confederations Cup. The chosen Goal Control system featured 14 high speed cameras, 7 directed to each of the goals. Data were sent to the central image-processing centre, where a virtual representation of the ball was output on a widescreen to confirm the goal. The referee was equipped with a watch which vibrated and displayed a signal upon a goal. France's second goal in their group game against Honduras was the first time goal-line technology was needed to confirm that a goal should be given.

Following successful trials, FIFA approved the use of vanishing spray by the referees for the first time at a World Cup Finals. The water-based spray, which disappears within minutes of application, can be used to mark a ten-yard line for the defending team during a free kick and also to draw where the ball is to be placed for a free kick.

The Adidas Brazuca was the official match ball of the 2014 FIFA World Cup and was supplied by Forward Sports of Sialkot, Pakistan. Adidas created a new design of ball after criticisms of the Adidas Jabulani used in the previous World Cup. The number of panels was reduced to six, with the panels being thermally bonded. This created a ball with increased consistency and aerodynamics compared to its predecessor. Furthermore, Adidas underwent an extensive testing process lasting more than two years to produce a ball that would meet the approval of football professionals.

Cooling breaks
Due to the relatively high ambient temperatures in Brazil, particularly at the northern venues, cooling breaks for the players were introduced. Breaks could take place at the referee's discretion after the 30th minute of each half if the Wet Bulb Globe Temperature exceeded ; the breaks would last 3 minutes, with this time made up by an extended period of stoppage time at the end of the half.

The first cooling break in a World Cup play took place during the 32nd minute of the match between the Netherlands and Mexico in the round of 16.

Anti-doping
The biological passport was introduced in the FIFA World Cup starting in 2014. Blood and urine samples collected from all players before the competition, and from two players per team per match, were analysed by the Swiss Laboratory for Doping Analyses. FIFA reported that 91.5% of the players taking part in the tournament were tested before the start of the competition and none tested positive. However, FIFA was criticised for how it conducted doping tests.

Format

The first round, or group stage, was a competition between the 32 teams divided among eight groups of four, where each group engaged in a round-robin tournament within itself. The two highest ranked teams in each group advanced to the knockout stage. Teams were awarded three points for a win and one for a draw. When comparing teams in a group over-all result came before head-to-head.

In the knockout stage there were four rounds (round of 16, quarter-finals, semi-finals, and the final), with each eliminating the losers. The two semi-final losers competed in a third place play-off. For any match in the knockout stage, a draw after 90 minutes of regulation time was followed by two 15 minute periods of extra time to determine a winner. If the teams were still tied, a penalty shoot-out was held to determine a winner.

The match schedule was announced on 20 October 2011 with the kick-off times being confirmed on 27 September 2012; after the final draw, the kick-off times of seven matches were adjusted by FIFA. The competition was organised so that teams that played each other in the group stage could not meet again during the knockout phase until the final (or the 3rd place match).
The group stage began on 12 June, with the host nation competing in the opening game as has been the format since the 2006 tournament. The opening game was preceded by an opening ceremony that began at 15:15 local time.

Opening ceremony

On 12 June 2014, the 20th edition of the FIFA World Cup began with the opening ceremony at Arena de São Paulo, São Paulo, Brazil. The event saw 660 dancers take to the stadium and perform in a ceremony which celebrated the nature of the country and its love of football. Following the dancers native singer Claudia Leitte emerged on centre stage to perform for the crowd. She was later joined by Cuban-American rapper Pitbull, and American singer Jennifer Lopez to perform the tournament's official song "We Are One (Ole Ola)" which had been released as an official single on 8 April 2014. Following the ceremony, the opening match was played, which saw the hosts come from behind to beat Croatia 3–1.

Group stage
The group stage of the cup took place in Brazil from 12 June 2014 to 26 June 2014: each team played three games. The group stage was notable for a scarcity of draws and a large number of goals. The first drawn (and goalless) match did not occur until the 13th match of the tournament, between Iran and Nigeria: a drought longer than any World Cup since 1930. The group stage produced a total of 136 goals (an average of 2.83 goals per match), nine fewer than were scored during the entire 2010 tournament. This is the largest number of goals in the group stage since the 32-team system was implemented in 1998 and the largest average in a group stage since 1958. World Cup holders Spain were eliminated after only two games, the quickest exit for the defending champions since Italy's from the 1950 tournament. Spain also became the fourth nation to be eliminated in the first round while holding the World Cup crown, the first one being Italy in 1950 (and again in 2010), Brazil in 1966, and France in 2002. For the first time, two teams from Africa advanced to the second round, a feat that would be repeated in the 2022 tournament.

Group A

Group B

Group C

Group D

Group E

Group F

Group G

Group H

Knockout stage

Scores after extra time are indicated by (aet), and penalty shoot-outs are indicated by (pen.).

Round of 16
All the group winners advanced into the quarter-finals. They included four teams from UEFA, three from CONMEBOL, and one from CONCACAF. Of the eight matches, five required extra-time, and two of these required penalty shoot-outs; this was the first time penalty shoot-outs occurred in more than one game in a round of 16. The goal average per game in the round of 16 was 2.25, a drop of 0.58 goals per game from the group stage. The eight teams to win in the round of 16 included four former champions (Brazil, Germany, Argentina and France), a three-time runner-up (Netherlands), and two first-time quarter-finalists (Colombia and Costa Rica). Belgium reached the quarter-finals for the first time since 1986.

All times listed below are at local time (UTC−3)

Quarter-finals
With a 1–0 victory over France, Germany set a World Cup record with four consecutive semi-final appearances. Brazil beat Colombia 2–1, but Brazil's Neymar was injured and missed the rest of the competition. Argentina reached the final four for the first time since 1990 after a 1–0 win over Belgium. The Netherlands reached the semi-finals for the second consecutive tournament, after overcoming Costa Rica in a penalty shoot-out following a 0–0 draw at the end of extra time, with goalkeeper Tim Krul having been substituted on for the shoot-out and saving two penalties.

Semi-finals
Germany qualified for the final for the eighth time with a historic 7–1 win over Brazil – the biggest defeat in Brazilian football since 1920. Miroslav Klose's goal in this match was his 16th throughout all World Cups, breaking the record he had previously shared with Ronaldo. Klose set another record by becoming the first player to appear in four World Cup semi-finals. Argentina reached their first final since 1990, and their fifth overall, after overcoming the Netherlands in a penalty shoot-out following a 0–0 draw at the end of extra time.

Third place play-off
The Netherlands defeated Brazil 3–0 to secure third place, the first for the Dutch team in their history. Overall, Brazil conceded 14 goals in the tournament; this was the most by a team at any single World Cup since 1986, and the most by a host nation in history, although their fourth-place finish still represented Brazil's best result in a World Cup since their last win in 2002.

Final

The final featured Germany against Argentina for a record third time after 1986 and 1990.

This marked the first time that teams from the same continent had won three consecutive World Cups (following Italy in 2006 and Spain in 2010). It was also the first time that a European nation had won the World Cup in the Americas. On aggregate Europe then had 11 victories, to South America's nine.

Statistics

Goalscorers
In total, 171 goals were scored by a record 121 players, with five credited as own goals. Goals scored from penalty shoot-outs are not counted.

Discipline
The most notable disciplinary case was that of Uruguayan striker Luis Suárez, who was suspended for nine international matches and banned from taking part in any football-related activity (including entering any stadium) for four months, following a biting incident on Italian defender Giorgio Chiellini. He was also fined CHF100,000. After an appeal to the Court of Arbitration for Sport, Suárez was later allowed to participate in training and friendly matches with new club Barcelona.

Awards

The following awards were given at the conclusion of the tournament:

Technical Study Group
The members of the Technical Study Group, the committee that decided which players won the awards, were led by FIFA's head of the Technical Division Jean-Paul Brigger and featured:

 Gérard Houllier
 Raul Arias
 Gabriel Calderón
 Ricki Herbert
 Abdel Moneim Hussein
 Kwok Ka Ming
 Ioan Lupescu
 Ginés Meléndez
 Tsuneyasu Miyamoto
 Sunday Oliseh
 Mixu Paatelainen
 Jaime Rodríguez
 Theodore Whitmore

There were changes to the voting procedure for awards for the 2014 edition: while in 2010 accredited media were allowed to vote for the Golden Ball award, in 2014 only the Technical Study Group could select the outcome.

All-Star Team
As was the case during the 2010 edition, FIFA released an All-Star Team based on the Castrol performance index in its official website.

Dream Team
FIFA also invited users of FIFA.com to elect their Dream Team.

Prize money
The total prize money on offer for the tournament was confirmed by FIFA as US$576 million (including payments of $70 million to domestic clubs and $100 million as player insurances), a 37 percent increase from the amount allocated in the 2010 tournament. Before the tournament, each of the 32 entrants received $1.5 million for preparation costs. At the tournament, the prize money was distributed as follows:

 $8 million – To each team eliminated at the group stage (16 teams)
 $9 million – To each team eliminated in the round of 16 (8 teams)
 $14 million – To each team eliminated in the quarter-finals (4 teams)
 $20 million – Fourth placed team
 $22 million – Third placed team
 $25 million – Runner-up
 $35 million – Winner

Final standings
Per statistical convention in football, matches decided in extra time are counted as wins and losses, while matches decided by penalty shoot-outs are counted as draws.

|-
|colspan="11"|Eliminated in the quarter-finals
|-

|-
|colspan="11"|Eliminated in the round of 16
|-

|-
|colspan="11"|Eliminated in the group stage
|-

|}

Preparations and costs

Costs of the tournament totalled $11.6 billion,  making it the most expensive World Cup to date, until surpassed by 2018 FIFA World Cup which cost an estimated $14.2 billion. FIFA was expected to spend US$2 billion on staging the finals, with its greatest single expense being the US$576 million prize money pot.

Although organisers originally estimated costs of US$1.1 billion, a reported US$3.6 billion was ultimately spent on stadium works. Five of the chosen host cities had brand new venues built specifically for the World Cup, while the Estádio Nacional Mané Garrincha in the capital Brasília was demolished and rebuilt, with the remaining six being extensively renovated.

An additional R$3 billion (US$1.3 billion, €960 million, £780 million at June 2014 rates) was earmarked by the Brazilian government for investment in infrastructure works and projects for use during the 2014 World Cup and beyond. However, the failed completion of many of the proposed works provoked discontent among some Brazilians.

The Brazilian government pledged US$900 million to be invested into security forces and that the tournament would be "one of the most protected sports events in history."

Marketing

The marketing of the 2014 FIFA World Cup included sale of tickets, support from sponsors and promotion through events that utilise the symbols and songs of the tournament. Popular merchandise included items featuring the official mascot as well as an official video game that has been developed by EA Sports. As a partner of the German Football Association, part of German major airline Lufthansa's fleet was branded "Fanhansa" for the time being. Branded planes flew the Germany national team, media representatives and football fans to Brazil.

The Sony Xperia Z2 was dubbed the "official smartphone of the 2014 FIFA World Cup".

Sponsorship
The sponsors of the 2014 World Cup are divided into three categories: FIFA Partners, FIFA World Cup Sponsors and National Supporters.

Symbols

Mascot

The official mascot of this World Cup was "Fuleco"

Match ball

The official match ball was "Brazuca", manufactured by Adidas.

Music

The official song of the tournament was "We Are One (Ole Ola)" with vocals from Pitbull, Jennifer Lopez and Claudia Leitte.

The official mascot song was "Tatu Bom de Bola".

The official anthem was "Dar um Jeito (We Will Find a Way)".

Media

For a fourth consecutive FIFA World Cup Finals, the coverage was provided by HBS (Host Broadcast Services), a subsidiary of Infront Sports & Media. Sony was selected as the official equipment provider and built 12 bespoke high definition production 40-foot-long containers, one for each tournament venue, to house the extensive amount of equipment required. Each match utilised 37 standard camera plans, including Aerial and Cablecam, two Ultramotion cameras and dedicated cameras for interviews. The official tournament film, as well as three matches, will be filmed with ultra high definition technology (4K resolution), following a successful trial at the 2013 FIFA Confederations Cup.

The broadcasting rights – covering television, radio, internet and mobile coverage – for the tournament were sold to media companies in each individual territory either directly by FIFA, or through licensed companies or organisations such as the European Broadcasting Union, Organización de Televisión Iberoamericana, International Media Content, Dentsu and RS International Broadcasting & Sports Management. The sale of these rights accounted for an estimated 60% of FIFA's income from staging a World Cup. The International Broadcast Centre was situated at the Riocentro in the Barra da Tijuca neighbourhood of Rio de Janeiro.

Worldwide, several games qualified as the most-watched sporting events in their country in 2014, including 42.9 million people in Brazil for the opening game between Brazil and Croatia, the 34.1 million in Japan who saw their team play Ivory Coast, and 34.7 million in Germany who saw their national team win the World Cup against Argentina, while the 24.7 million viewers during the game between the US and Portugal is joint with the 2010 final as the most-watched football game in the United States. According to FIFA, over 1 billion people tuned in worldwide to watch the final between Germany and Argentina.

Controversies

The 2014 FIFA World Cup generated various controversies, including demonstrations, some of which took place even before the tournament started. Furthermore, there were various issues with safety, including the death of eight workers and a fire during construction, breaches into stadiums, an unstable makeshift staircase at the Maracanã Stadium, a monorail collapse, and the collapse of an unfinished overpass in Belo Horizonte. The houses of thousands of families living in Rio de Janeiro’s slums were cleared for redevelopments for the World Cup in spite of protests and resistance. Favela do Metrô, near the Maracanã Stadium, was completely destroyed as a result, having previously housed 700 families in 2010.

Protests

Prior to the opening ceremony of the 2013 FIFA Confederations Cup staged in Brazil, demonstrations took place outside the venue, organised by people unhappy with the amount of public money spent to enable the hosting of the FIFA World Cup. Both the Brazilian president Dilma Rousseff and FIFA president Sepp Blatter were heavily booed as they were announced to give their speeches at the 2013 tournament's opening, which resulted in FIFA announcing that the 2014 FIFA World Cup opening ceremony would not feature any speeches. Further protests took place during the Confederations Cup as well as prior to and during the World Cup.

Breaches into stadiums

At the Group B match between Spain and Chile, around 100 Chilean supporters who had gathered outside Maracanã Stadium forced their way into the stadium and caused damage to the media centre. Military police reported that 85 Chileans were detained during the events, while others reached the stands. Earlier, about 20 Argentinians made a similar breach during Argentina's Group F game against Bosnia and Herzegovina at the same stadium.

Bridge collapse

On 3 July 2014, an overpass under construction in Belo Horizonte as part of the World Cup infrastructure projects collapsed onto a busy carriageway below, leaving two people dead and 22 others injured.

Head injuries
During the tournament, FIFA received significant criticism for the way head injuries are handled during matches. Two incidents in particular attracted the most attention. First, in a group stage match, after Uruguayan defender Álvaro Pereira received a blow to the head, he lay unconscious. The Uruguayan doctor signaled for the player to be substituted, but he returned to the match. The incident drew criticism from the professional players' union FIFPro, and from Michel D'Hooghe, a member of the FIFA executive board and chairman of its medical committee.

Second, in the Final, German midfielder Christoph Kramer received a blow to the head from a collision in the 14th minute, but returned to the match before collapsing in the 31st minute. During that time, Kramer was disoriented and confused, and asked the referee Nicola Rizzoli whether the match he was playing in was the World Cup Final.

See also
 2015 FIFA Women's World Cup
 FIFA World Cup

Notes

References

External links

2014 FIFA World Cup Brazil™ at FIFA.com
2014 FIFA World Cup at UEFA.com
Official Brazil government website
Regulations – 2014 FIFA World Cup Brazil
FIFA Technical Report
Archive of finals at RSSSF
2014 FIFA World Cup  The Official Film (On YouTube)

 
2014 in association football
2014 in Brazilian football
2014
2014 FIFA World Cup
June 2014 sports events in South America
July 2014 sports events in South America